Philipp Schörghofer (born 20 January 1983) is an Austrian former World Cup alpine ski racer. He represented Austria at two Winter Olympics and four World Championships.

World Cup results

Season standings

Race podiums
 1 win – (1 GS)
 6 podiums – (6 GS)

World Championship results

Olympic results

References

External links
 
 Philipp Schoerghofer World Cup standings at the International Ski Federation
 
 Philipp Schoerghofer at Austrian Ski team official site 
 
  

1983 births
Living people
Austrian male alpine skiers
Olympic alpine skiers of Austria
Alpine skiers at the 2010 Winter Olympics
Sportspeople from Salzburg
Alpine skiers at the 2014 Winter Olympics